Chelston, also Chelstone or Chakunkula, is a neighborhood in Zambia's capital city, Lusaka.

Location
To Chelston's west are the neighbourhoods of Munali and Kamanga. To the south is the T4 Highway. To the east is the Airport Road, leading to Kenneth Kaunda International Airport (KKIA). To the north is the swamp that lies west of KKIA. The geographical coordinates of Chelston are: 15°21'57.0"S, 28°23'07.0"E (Latitude:-15.365823; Longitude:28.385265).

Overview
Chelston is a high-class residential neighbourhood. The predominant residences are single family homes for civil servants and other workers in the city.

See also 
List of banks in Zambia
Lusaka

References

External links
Website of Lusaka City Council
What Is Behind Lusaka Township Names?

Neighborhoods of Lusaka